Bandit is a 1994 American made-for-television spin-off film series based on the Smokey and the Bandit franchise. The four telefilms – Bandit Goes Country, Bandit Bandit, Beauty and the Bandit and Bandit's Silver Angel – were produced for Universal Television's Action Pack programming block from original Smokey and the Bandit director/writer Hal Needham.

Brian Bloom stars as a younger version of Bo "the Bandit" Darville, the character originated by Burt Reynolds in Smokey and the Bandit (1977) and Smokey and the Bandit II (1980). The series also serves as a prequel as it focuses on events that took place prior to the original film. The car featured in this series is a Dodge Stealth, while the Smokey and the Bandit films introduced two generations of the Pontiac Trans Am.

Bandit Goes Country 
The Bandit (Brian Bloom) goes home for a family reunion and along the way, he meets music star Mel Tillis, who is forced to make an emergency landing when his plane malfunctions. The Bandit helps Mel, but soon finds himself in hot water when his cousin Johnny (Christopher Atkins) gets into the music bootlegging business.

The film was written by Chris Abbott and originally aired on January 30, 1994.

Bandit Bandit 
A Bandit impostor (Gerard Christopher) lands the real Bandit (Bloom) in jail, but he needs to break out so he can deliver a futuristic car safely to Governor Denton (Gary Collins).

The film was written by Brock Yates and originally aired on March 13, 1994.

Beauty and the Bandit 
The Bandit (Bloom) is on the run with Crystal "the Beauty" (Kathy Ireland), a young woman being pursued by a mobster (Tony Curtis), a bounty hunter (Joseph Cortese) and the FBI.

The film was written by David Chisholm and originally aired on April 3, 1994.

Bandit's Silver Angel 
The Bandit (Bloom) gets an unexpected visit from his Uncle Cyrus (Donald O'Connor) who later dies of a heart attack, leaving his carnival to his widow Angel (Traci Lords). The Bandit helps Angel face off against some shady characters smuggling stolen silver ingots hidden in the carnival.

The film was written by Jay Huguely and originally aired on April 10, 1994.

Home media
On October 12, 2010, Universal Pictures Home Entertainment released all four television films on DVD along with the Smokey and the Bandit trilogy as part of Smokey and the Bandit: The 7-Movie Outlaw Collection.

See also
 Smokey and the Bandit
 Smokey and the Bandit II
 Smokey and the Bandit Part 3

References

External links
 
 
 
 

1994 films
1994 television films
1994 action comedy films
American television films
American action comedy films
American film series
Television prequel films
Film spin-offs
First-run syndicated television programs in the United States
Films directed by Hal Needham
Films scored by Steve Dorff
Action Pack (TV programming block)
Smokey and the Bandit
1990s American films
American prequel films